Luperosaurus kubli is a species of gecko, a lizard in the family Gekkonidae. The species is endemic to Luzon in the Philippines.

Habitat

Description
L. kubli has webbing between all adjacent fingers and toes, a cutaneous fold on the front legs, and a flap on the hind legs.

Behavior
L. kubli has the ability to glide or parachute from tree to tree.

Reproduction
L. kubli is oviparous.

References

Further reading
Brown RM, Diesmos AC, Duya MV (2007). "A new Luperosaurus (Squamata: Gekkonidae) from the Sierra Madre of Luzon Island, Philippines". Raffles Bulletin of Zoology 55 (1): 167–174. (Luperosaurus kubli, new species).
Brown RM, Siler CD, Oliveros CH, Welton LJ, Rock A, Swab J, Van Weerd M, van Beijnen J, Jose E, Rodriguez D, Jose E, Diesmos AC (2013). "The amphibians and reptiles of Luzon Island, Philippines, VIII: the herpetofauna of Cagayan and Isabela Provinces, northern Sierra Madre Mountain Range". Zookeys 266: 1–120.

Luperosaurus
Reptiles described in 2007
Reptiles of the Philippines
Endemic fauna of the Philippines
Fauna of Luzon